Richland Township is a township in Decatur County, Iowa, USA.  As of the 2000 census, its population was 394.

Geography
Richland Township covers an area of 35.78 square miles (92.67 square kilometers); of this, 0.04 square miles (0.1 square kilometers) or 0.11 percent is water. The stream of Sand Creek runs through this township.

Cities and towns
 Grand River

Adjacent townships
 Doyle Township, Clarke County (north)
 Knox Township, Clarke County (northeast)
 Long Creek Township (east)
 Decatur Township (southeast)
 Grand River Township (south)
 Monroe Township, Ringgold County (southwest)
 Union Township, Ringgold County (west)
 Pleasant Township, Union County (northwest)

Cemeteries
The township contains six cemeteries: Grand River, O'Grady, Tennessee, Warrick, Westervelt and Young.

Major highways

References
 U.S. Board on Geographic Names (GNIS)
 United States Census Bureau cartographic boundary files

External links
 US-Counties.com
 City-Data.com

Townships in Decatur County, Iowa
Townships in Iowa